Eesti Gaas AS, branded internationally as Elenger, is an energy company with headquarters in Tallinn, Estonia. The company's main activity is selling and distributing of natural gas in Estonian, Latvian, Finnish, and Lithuanian markets. Eesti Gaas product portfolio includes also LNG, CNG, and electricity, including solar energy.

History
The predecessor of Eesti Gaas was established in 1948, and it was the first gas transport company in Estonia. In 1948–1957 it transported through the Kohtla-Järve – Leningrad pipeline Estonian oil shale gas to Leningrad, Later the pipeline was used in traverse mode to transport Russian natural gas to Estonia.

In 1988, the name 'Eesti Gaas' was first introduced, and in 1990, it was established as a state enterprise.  In 1993, AS Eesti Gaas was incorporated as a corporation. The company was partly privatized in 1993–1995. In 1993, 30% stake in Eesti Gaas was transferred to Lentransgaz (now: Gazprom Transgaz Saint Petersburg), a subsidiary of Gazprom, to eliminate the gas debt dispute. In 1994, Ruhrgas (later: E.ON Ruhrgas) acquired about 15% of the company's shares while the management of the company, together with other private investors and the UK-based Baltic Republic Fund, acquired 7.5% of shares both. As a result, the government of Estonia kept 39% stake. In December 1996, Ruhrgas increased its stake to 21%; 12% was sold to public. In January 1999, the remaining state-owned shares were sold. Ruhrgas increased its stake up to 32%, Gazprom kept its 30% stake, and Neste (later Fortum) got 10% stake. Later that year, Itera (now part of Rosneft) Latvian branch acquired nearly 10% stake from the Baltic Republic Fund. In following years, Gazprom increased its stake up to 37%, E.ON up to 33.66%, and Fortum up to 17.7% by buying shares from private investors. In 2014, E.ON sold its stake to Fortum, which became the largest shareholder with 51.4% stake. In February 2016, it was announced that Fortum will sell its stake to Trilini Energy, a company controlled by the investment firm Infortar, the major shareholder of the shipping company Tallink. Later, Trilini also acquired 50.9% of the shares owned previously by Gazprom and 1.15% of the shares owned by minority shareholders.

In 1998, all regional subsidiaries of Eesti Gaas were merged into the parent company. In December 2004, the gas infrastructure construction activities were transferred to the separate subsidiary, AS EG Ehitus. In 2005, the gas grid services (transmission and distribution) were transferred to the newly established subsidiary company EG Võrguteenus.  In 2013, the distribution network was separated from EG Võrguteenus into a newly established subsidiary of Eesti Gaas, AS Gaasivõrgud. In 2014, to implement the EU third energy package EG Võrguteenus was separated from Eesti Gaas.

In 2013, Eesti Gaas started to sell electricity.

In January 2018, Eesti Gaas started supplying liquefied natural gas (LNG) for the Tallink's ferry Megastar. In October 2018, Eesti Gaas announced that it will order 6,000-cubic-metre LNG barge for bunkering of ships in the northern and eastern part of the Baltic Sea. The barge would be ready by 2020, and it will be built by Damen Group.

Operations
Eesti Gaas imports, sells and distributes pipeline natural gas, as also compressed natural gas (CNG), including compressed biomethan, as fuel for vehicles and liquefied natural gas (LNG) as fuel for ships.  In addition to Estonia, Eesti Gaas also sells energy in Latvia, Lithuania and Finland.

Eesti Gaas has 11 CNG stations in Estonia which sell also biomethane. It provides LNG bunkering services to LNG-powered ships in Tallinn, Helsinki, and Hanko. The company delivers LNG by trucks from the LNG plant in Pskov in Russia and the Klaipeda LNG terminal in Lithuania, as also from Finland and Poland.

Eesti Gaas' subsidiary AS Gaasivõrk owns and operates the natural gas distribution network in Estonia. Eesti Gaas also sells electricity and owns stakes in solar parks with a total capacity around 4 MW.

See also
 Energy in Estonia

References

External links
 

Natural gas companies of Estonia
Companies based in Tallinn